Venustiano Carranza Municipality may refer to:
Venustiano Carranza Municipality, Chiapas - one of the municipalities of Chiapas
Venustiano Carranza Municipality, Michoacán - one of the municipalities of Michoacán
Venustiano Carranza Municipality, Puebla

Municipality name disambiguation pages